The Football Federation of the 1st Department Concepción (Federación de Fútbol Primer Departamento Concepción) is the departamental governing body of football (soccer) in the department of Concepción, in Paraguay. The federation is responsible for the organization of football leagues in the different cities of the department and it is also the regulator of the clubs. The main office of this federation is located in the city of Concepción.

Tournaments for each league of this federation are played every year to determine the best teams. Afterwards, the champions of each league face each other to determine the best team in the department, with the overall winner being promoted to a higher division in the Paraguayan football league system.

Leagues in Concepción

Liga Concepcionera de Fútbol
The Liga Concepcionera de Fútbol is based in the city of Concepción. The following teams are part of this league:
 Sportivo Obrero
 Nanawa
 Independencia FBC
 Adolfo Riquelme
 Mariscal López
 Gral. Eugenio Garay
 Sportivo Cerro Corá
 Deportivo Beleano
 Villareal

Liga Horqueteña de Fútbol
The Liga Horqueteña de Fútbol is based in the city of Horqueta. The following teams are part of this league:
 Libertad
 Sport Capitan Walter Gwynn
 San Lorenzo
 Racing Club Horqueta
 Deportivo Horqueteño
 Sport Caacupé
 Fulgencio Yegros

Liga Loreteña de Fútbol
The Liga Loreteña de Fútbol is based in the city of Loreto. The following teams are part of this league:
 Atlético Independiente
 Sportivo Agrícola
 10 de Diciembre
 Teniente 1° Adolfo Rojas Silva
 6 de Enero
 Sportivo Florida
 Cerro Porteño

Liga Deportiva Vallemi
The Liga Deportiva Vallemi is based in the city of Vallemi. The following teams are part of this league:
 Oriental FBC
 Independiente FBC
 Sportivo Vallemi
 Sportivo Obrero
 29 de Setiembre
 Sportivo Caleros Unidos del Norte

Liga Ybyyauense de Fútbol
The Liga Ybyyauense de Fútbol is based in the city of Yby Yaú. The following teams are part of this league:
 Atlético San Ramón
 Nacional
 Sportivo San Juan
 13 de Junio
 Atlético Yby Yaú
 1° de Mayo

External links
 UFI Website

Concepcion
Concepción Department, Paraguay